Santo Amaro is a Portuguese parish in the municipality of Sousel. The population in 2011 was 644, in an area of 39.61 km2.

References

Parishes of Sousel